The Party for Animal Welfare is a minor political party in Ireland, with a focus on animal welfare.

Policies and activities
They advocate the banning of blood sports, puppy farms, factory farming, greyhound racing and other animal cruelties. They have petitioned for the adding of animal welfare to the Irish primary school curriculum.

The Party for Animal Welfare held a protest in Dingle, County Kerry during February 2020 to oppose a proposed seal cull, which local fishermen had been calling for to increase fish stocks. In conjunction with Compassion in World Farming Ireland, the party held protests against the export of live animals outside Leinster House and Rosslare Europort in 2019 and 2020.

Elections
In the 2020 Irish general election, before the party had registered, PAW's deputy leader Ted Cronin ran as an independent on an animal welfare platform. He received 391 (0.5%) first preference votes in the Kerry constituency, being eliminated in the third count, coming second last.

Affiliation
PAW is a member of the Animal Politics Foundation. Although not an official member, the Animal Politics EU group has recognised the Party for Animal Welfare and members of the group have expressed support for them.

References

Animal advocacy parties
Political parties in the Republic of Ireland